The Volleyball 2019–20 V.League Division 1 Men's was the 26th tournament of the V.League and the highest level men's tournament in Japan, which was held from October 26, 2019 – February 29, 2020.

Clubs

Personnel

Transfer players

Foreign players 
The total number of foreign players is restricted to one per club. Player from Asian Volleyball Confederation (AVC) nations are exempt from these restrictions.

Withdrawn and retired players 
The list of withdrawn and retired players that officially announced the withdrawal or retirement since April 2019 to February 2020.

Informal players 
An informal player is a trainee who came in the team and has not registered as V.League player yet. Mostly, the player still is in the last year of university or high school.

Squads

Season standing procedure
The teams will be ranked by the total number of victories (matches won, matched lost) 
 In the event of a tie, the following first tiebreaker will apply: the most point gained per match as follows: 
The teams will be ranked by the most point gained per match as follows:
Match won 3–0 or 3–1: 3 points for the winner, 0 points for the loser
Match won 3–2: 2 points for the winner, 1 point for the loser
Match forfeited: 3 points for the winner, 0 points (0–25, 0–25, 0–25) for the loser
 If teams are still tied after examining the number of victories and points gained, then the FIVB will examine the results in order to break the tie in the following order:
Set quotient: if two or more teams are tied on total number of victories, they will be ranked by the quotient resulting from the division of the number of all set won by the number of all sets lost.
Points quotient: if the tie persists based on the set quotient, the teams will be ranked by the quotient resulting from the division of all points scored by the total of points lost during all sets.
If the tie persists based on the point quotient, the tie will be broken based on the team that won the match of the Round Robin Phase between the tied teams. When the tie in point quotient is between three or more teams, these teams ranked taking into consideration only the matches involving the teams in question.

Regular Round

Standings 

Source: Ranking Table V.league Division 1 Men's 2019–20

Leg 1

Week 1

Stadium

Results 
 All times are Japan Standard Time (UTC+09:00).

|}

Week 2

Stadium

Results 
 All times are Japan Standard Time (UTC+09:00).

|}

Week 3

Stadium

Results 
 All times are Japan Standard Time (UTC+09:00).

|}

Week 4

Stadium

Results 
 All times are Japan Standard Time (UTC+09:00).

|}

Week 5

Stadium

Results 
 All times are Japan Standard Time (UTC+09:00).

|}

Leg 2

Week 1

Stadium

Results 
 All times are Japan Standard Time (UTC+09:00).

|}

Week 2

Stadium

Results 
 All times are Japan Standard Time (UTC+09:00).

|}

Week 3

Stadium

Results 
 All times are Japan Standard Time (UTC+09:00).

|}

Week 4

Stadium

Results 
 All times are Japan Standard Time (UTC+09:00).

|}

Week 5

Stadium

Results 
 All times are Japan Standard Time (UTC+09:00).

|}

Leg 3

Week 1

Stadium

Results 
 All times are Japan Standard Time (UTC+09:00).

|}

Week2

Stadium

Results 
 All times are Japan Standard Time (UTC+09:00).

|}

Week 3

Stadium

Results 
 All times are Japan Standard Time (UTC+09:00).

|}

Week 4

Stadium

Results 
 All times are Japan Standard Time (UTC+09:00).

|}

Week 5

Stadium

Results 
 All times are Japan Standard Time (UTC+09:00).

|}

Final Stage

Game 1 (5th place playoff)

Procedure
The 5th place of Regular Round will compete against the 4th place, the winner will pass to the 4th place playoff

Result

Game 2 (4th place playoff)

Procedure
The winner of Game 1 will compete against the 3rd place of Regular Round, the winner will pass to the Semifinal Round

Result

Semifinal (3rd place playoff)

Procedure
The winner of Game 2 will compete against the 2nd place of Regular Round, the winner will pass to the Final Round

Result

Final
The final match was held without spectators due to COVID-19 pandemic.

Result

Final standing

Awards
The list of awards which distributed at the end of the season

Individual

Most Valuable Player
  Yuji Nishida
Winner Head Coach
  Shinji Takahashi
Fighting-spirit
  Kunihiro Shimizu

Top scorer
  Yuji Nishida
Best Spiker
  Taishi Onodera
Best Blocker
  Taishi Onodera

Best Server
  Yuji Nishida
Best Serve Receiver
  
Best Receiver
  

Best 6
  Yuji Nishida
  Michał Kubiak
  Dmitry Muserskiy
  Rao Shuhan
  Taishi Onodera
  Hideomi Fukatsu

Best Libero
  Ryuta Homma
Best New Player

Special Award
 V.League Honor Award
The award was distributed to players who participate in 10 seasons or more , 230 games or more. Except for Takeshi Nagano who received 10 or more individual awards.

  
  
  Kunihiro Shimizu
  
  Takeshi Nagano

See also
 2019–20 V.League Division 1 Women's

References

External links
 Official website 

V.League 1 Men
V.League 1 Men
Men's
2019 in Japanese sport
2020 in Japanese sport